Apoorvaragam is a 2010 Malayalam-language thriller film written by G. S. Anand and Najeem Koya, and directed by Sibi Malayil. The film stars Nishan, Asif Ali, Nithya Menon, Vinay Forrt, Abhilash and Hima. It released on 16 July 2010 across 42 theaters in Kerala.

The film ran more than 50 days in kerala and became a hit at the box office. It was later dubbed into Telugu as 50% Love.

Plot 
Apoorvaragam is the story of three youngsters Roopesh, Nancy and Tommy. Roopesh has always been in love with Nancy but has never had the nerve to express it. For Nancy, love is something that is beyond words. Tommy is the perfect Cupid, who would make things happen for these two. Slowly Roopesh and Nancy fall in love. Behind their backs Tommy calls Nancy's father and informs him that his daughter is dating someone from the college. Her daddy trusts her and so does not take this seriously at first. But later when he grows more suspicious, he decides to marry her off to someone he knows.

Nancy and Roopesh register their marriage. Tommy makes another call to her father and informs him that his daughter has gotten married. Her father, after verifying this information, comes and meets Roopesh. He tells Roopesh that he is ready to give any amount to him to withdraw from the relation. Roopesh tells him that he is not in love with Nancy and is only doing this for money. Roopesh demands Rs. 1 crore to back out from the relation and Nancy's father gives it.

Roopesh, Tommy and their third companion Narayanan is later seen trying to do the same with another rich man's daughter. While the trap was being set, Roopesh gets in touch with Nancy and tells her the truth. He steals their ransom money from their hideout and gives it back to her dad in the hope to reunite with Nancy. But Nancy reveals that she was only pretending to be in love with him because she wanted the money back and that she wanted to break his heart in return. She gets engaged to the guy chosen by her father in front of Roopesh.

Tommy and Narayanan follow them back to this place and abduct Roopesh and Nancy. In the fight that follows, Roopesh grabs the gun and shoots Tommy and Narayanan. He then calls Nancy's father to come and pick her up. When she was about to leave, Roopesh bids her adieu and shoots himself. Nancy cries out loud suggesting that she was in love with Roopesh.

Cast 
 Nishan as Roopesh
 Asif Ali as Tomy
 Nithya Menen as Nancy
 Vinay Forrt as Narayanan
 Abhishek Raveendran as Firoz
 Jagathy Sreekumar as adv.charly
 Hima Shankar
 Santhosh Jogi as Sethu
 Aneesh G Menon
 Suman as pilipose melipra
 Sruthi Menon
 L. Raja as Nancy's father

Reception 
Apoorvaragam had a cold reception and neared failure at the box office, but word of mouth dragged the film on to run 60 days all over Kerala with average response. There were 35% removals in its 50th day.

Soundtrack 

The songs were composed by Vidyasagar with lyrics penned by Santhosh Varma. The film score was composed by Bijibal.

See also 
 For the 1975 film directed by K. Balachander, Apoorva Raagangal

References

External links 
 
 

2010 films
2010s Malayalam-language films
2010s romantic thriller films
Films scored by Vidyasagar
Films directed by Sibi Malayil
Indian romantic thriller films